The El Paso Mountains Wilderness was created in 1994 and now has a total of . All of the wilderness is in the northern Mojave Desert in eastern Kern County, California and is managed by the Bureau of Land Management. It is located south of Ridgecrest, California.

Geography
The wilderness contains numerous reddish-colored buttes and dark, uplifted volcanic mesas dissected by narrow canyons. The highest point and central feature of this wilderness is Black Mountain, an extinct volcano. Surrounding the mountain is a badlands topography.

Flora and fauna
The most spectacular attribute of this area is the abundance of cultural sites. The southern portion of the wilderness is included in the Last Chance Archaeological District and is listed on the National Register of Historic Places. Wildlife includes raptors, Mohave ground squirrel, and the desert tortoise. Vegetation primarily consists of creosote bush scrub community with Joshua trees on the western side of the mountain.

See also
 Protected areas of the Mojave Desert
 Category: Flora of the California desert regions
 Category: Fauna of the Mojave Desert

References
 BLM−Bureau of Land Management: Official El Paso Mountains Wilderness website
 Wilderness.net: El Paso Mountains Wilderness
 Adventuring in the California Desert; Lynne Foster; Sierra Club Books; 1987;

Archaeological sites in California
Protected areas of the Mojave Desert
Wilderness areas of California
Bureau of Land Management areas in California
Protected areas of Kern County, California
Ridgecrest, California
1994 establishments in California
Protected areas established in 1994